Mangkolemba is a town and sub-division of Mokokchung District in the Indian state of Nagaland. Bounded by rivers and mountains, it covers an area of about 2sq. km. The valley is noted for its rice production. It has a population of about 6000 people and it has about 1300 households. The town is the sub-divisional HQ. of three ranges, namely, Jangpetkong, Japukong and Tzürangkong (covering about 40 villages).

References

Mokokchung